The 1988 NCAA Division I-AA football season, part of college football in the United States organized by the National Collegiate Athletic Association at the Division I-AA level, began in August 1988, and concluded with the 1988 NCAA Division I-AA Football Championship Game on December 17, 1988, at Holt Arena in Pocatello, Idaho. The Furman Paladins won their first I-AA championship, defeating the Georgia Southern Eagles by a score of 17−12.

Conference changes and new programs

Conference standings

Conference champions

Postseason
The top four teams were seeded, and thus assured of home games in the first round.

NCAA Division I-AA playoff bracket

* Next to team name denotes host institution

Source:

References